Varia may refer to:

 Varia (fish), a former name of the fish genus Variichthys
 Varia (moth), a moth genus
 Varia (Xena), character on Xena: Warrior Princess
 Varia Suit, an armor expansion in the Metroid video game series
 The Varia, a fictional assassination squad in the anime/manga series Reborn!
 Varia (Cyrillic: Варя), a short form of the female name Varvara (Cyrillic: Варвара) in Russian, Bulgarian and other languages
 Radu Varia (born 1940), Romanian art critic and art historian
 Vicovaro or Varia, a town in Italy